Peter Molloy, also known as Pat Molloy (20 April 1909 – 16 February 1993) was an English professional football player, manager and referee.

Club career
Born in Rossendale, Molloy played as a wing half in the Football League for Bristol Rovers during the 1933–34 season, making six appearances.

He also played for Fulham, Cardiff City, Queens Park Rangers, Stockport County, Carlisle United and Bradford City.

Molloy also made one guest appearance as a player for Watford during a wartime game against Aldershot on 2 January 1943.

Coaching and management
Molloy managed Turkish club side Galatasaray between 1947 and 1949. He later managed the Turkish national side in two spells, before moving onto Fenerbahçe. He returned to England in 1951, working as a trainer at Watford between 1951 and 1976. During this time, he had a benefit match against rivals Luton in 1968 and a testimonial against Wolves in 1973.

Refereeing
Molloy was also a noted referee in Turkey.

Personal life
Molloy served in the British Army during the Second World War.

References

1909 births
1993 deaths
English footballers
Association football midfielders
Accrington Stanley F.C. (1891) players
Fulham F.C. players
Bristol Rovers F.C. players
Cardiff City F.C. players
Queens Park Rangers F.C. players
Stockport County F.C. players
Carlisle United F.C. players
Bradford City A.F.C. players
English Football League players
Watford F.C. wartime guest players
English football managers
Galatasaray S.K. (football) managers
Turkey national football team managers
Fenerbahçe football managers
Watford F.C. non-playing staff
British Army personnel of World War II